Lívia Ventura (born 18 January 1987) is a Brazilian handball player who plays as a pivot for Pinheiros and for Brazil internationally. She made her Olympic debut representing Brazil at the 2020 Summer Olympics.

She was included in the Brazilian squad in the women's handball competition for the 2020 Summer Olympics.

Titles
 South and Central American Women's Club Handball Championship: 2022

References

1987 births
Living people
Brazilian female handball players
Olympic handball players of Brazil
Handball players at the 2020 Summer Olympics
21st-century Brazilian women
Competitors at the 2022 South American Games
South American Games gold medalists for Brazil
South American Games medalists in handball